Anime Detour is an annual three-day anime convention held during March/April at the Hyatt Regency Minneapolis in Minneapolis, Minnesota. The convention run by the non-profit organization Anime Twin Cities.

Programming
The convention typically offers anime music videos, anime rooms, artist alley, costume contests, guest panels, a masquerade, vendors' room, and workshops.

History
The convention in 2009 had an attendance cap of 3,500, and was sold out a month ahead of the event. In 2011 the convention held a fundraiser for voice actor Greg Ayres, who needed dental work due to an attack he suffered during his youth. Anime Detour 2011 raised $36,000 towards tsunami relief, resulting in Anime Twin Cities being awarded the American Red Cross Donor Award. The convention and its parent company Anime Twin Cities, inc held a fundraiser for voice actress Carrie Savage in 2013, to help with costs due to muscular dystrophy. Anime Detour and its parent company Anime Twin Cities created a fundraiser for voice actor Christopher Ayres in late 2017, to help with his COPD medical costs. The convention moved to a larger location in Minneapolis for 2018. Anime Detour 2020 was cancelled due to the COVID-19 pandemic. Anime Detour 2021 was also cancelled due to the COVID-19 pandemic.

Event History

References

External links
 Anime Detour Website

Anime conventions in the United States
Recurring events established in 2004
2004 establishments in Minnesota
Annual events in Minnesota
Conventions in Minnesota
Culture of Minneapolis
Tourist attractions in Minneapolis
Tourist attractions in Hennepin County, Minnesota